Marlene Weinstock, (January 29, 1943 – August 31, 1997) commonly known by her stage name Lotus Weinstock, was an American stand-up comedian, author, musician and actress.

Early life 
Weinstock was born in 1943 in Philadelphia, Pennsylvania. Her parents were Robert and Lucille Weinstock. She was a natural performer throughout her childhood and into high school she was known to improvise bits with friends and play the role of the mascot on her cheerleading team. Though she considered to be a great performer, she often felt like an outcast growing up. After high school, Lotus went to Emerson College but dropped out to move to New York and try acting and dance, succeeding in acquiring a few Off-Broadway roles. Approximately, in 1963 she became a hostess at the oldest rock and roll club in NYC, Greenwich Village's Bitter End.

Career

Singing and writing 
Lotus was a stand-up comedian, author to a book, a play, and was a musician. Her book, The Lotus Position, is filled with some of her famous anecdotes like, "I married Mr. Right. Mr. Always Right." Some of these anecdotes also made it onto greeting cards. The Lotus Position sold about 63,000 copies. Lotus also wrote the play, "Molly and Maze" that she put on with her daughter, Lili Haydn a few times. More than just the play, Lotus and Lili also performed music together. By herself, however, Lotus performed in a musical comedy duo, "The Turtles" with Jimmy Gavin. Together, they toured the folk scene circuit. Early in her career, she changed her name to Maurey Haydn. Under this name, one of her songs was recorded by Richie Havens.

Comedy: style and stage presence 
Lotus was known in the comedy world for making jokes that never punched down at someone. In other words, Lotus’ humor was ethical and not at anyone’s expense. Lotus saw the power in laughter. She believed that "when a whole roomful of people are laughing, suddenly you have  dissolved the pain and shame of separateness. At that moment, there is no judgment—it is a true release." Lotus showed this through her interviews where she would always take an opportunity to make people laugh. It was not just her spoken word jokes that made Lotus so endearing in the comedy world. She had a stage presence that worked in her favor, at times even wearing a bathrobe during her sets. As most of Lotus’ jokes and moments have, there is  always a story behind them, and it often involves her sense of spirituality. For this robe story, Lotus had been too sick to get dressed for a show but still wanted to perform. So, she decided to wear her robe on stage. She ended up recovering quickly and attributed this to the robe and thus its presence in her future shows.

Lotus performed on The Merv Griffin Show, The Tonight Show, The Mike Douglas Show, Politically Incorrect, Make Me Laugh, and The Comedy Store "Pilot." That being said, she didn't perform much on television because she could rarely stay within the performance time constraints; she preferred to do her own thing. She is well known by other comedians and even is cited in books about comedy and specific jokes. However, much like all comedians, she was also critiqued for her comedy and performances throughout her careers. She's been referred to as a "stilted actress" as well as too personal and lecture-like. That being said, Lotus remained and has remained an influential name in the comedy world, especially for other comedians. She's known to be a large influence in Sandra Bernhard’s comedy career.

Being a woman in comedy 
A good amount of Lotus’ humor had to do with being a woman. She joked about her marriage and dating and was also aware of the difference between how women comedians could act versus men. Lotus also dealt with sexual harassment throughout her time as a comedian. She was always a feminist, however, and was optimistic about what that meant for the comedy world. She's quoted saying, "Ten years ago, a woman would not laugh before her date did, so if you did something from a woman’s point of view, the woman wouldn’t want to laugh and expose herself. Now, women will lead the crowd." Lotus' optimistic stance on the power that women have in comedy influenced other women comedians.

Lotus was a massive part of the Belly Room, a performance area in the Comedy Store that Mitzi Shore, the owner, opened as a place for only women to perform. Lotus was thirty-six when the Belly Room opened in 1978. She was considered a "den mother" there, being an older, but very excited participant. She and some other women performing in The Belly Room felt it was a place where there was less need for competition and women could perform in a giving environment. The Comedy Store is also where Lotus and a few other women comedians at the time participated in the USC College of Continuing Education Workshop, "Women and Comedy" in March 1985. In this space they spoke to other participants about the trials and tribulations of being a woman in comedy. This included how to succeed, what to use on stage, what not to use, where to perform, and more. Throughout this workshop the major point that the women made was to be the most confident version of oneself when they performed. At one point Lotus said, "Confidence speaks louder than gender."

Who and what she influenced 
Lotus was asaid to be a major influence on many comedians. She was particularly influential on Sandra Bernhard and other women comedians, especially those that performed in the Belly Room. Lotus was written up in the book of Great Jewish Mothers by Paula Ethel Wolfson. Her jokes, that were never at anyone else's expense, have been influential on the comedy world, helping to show early on that comedians do not need to put others down to be funny.

Who and what influenced her 
Lenny Bruce was a massive influence, not just in Lotus’ life, but in her career as a comedian. His commitment to telling the truth through comedy was something Lotus appreciated, and it shows up in her bits as well. Lotus' close comedic friends in the eighties were Larry Miller, Lucy Webb, Sandra Bernhard, Diane Nichols, Robert Weide, Jay Leno, Jerry Seinfeld, Paul Reiser, Kevin Pollak, Sam Kinison, Paul Mooney, Richard Pryor, Robin Williams, Hennen Chambers, Carrie Snow, Joanne Dearing, Ron Zimmerman, Bill Maher, Argus Hamilton, Taylor Negron, and Phyllis Diller. Lotus was also influenced by motherhood, feminism, and Judaism; three parts of her life that she held very dear.

Later career 
Towards the end of Lotus' career, Joan Rivers accepted the invitation to write the foreword to Lotus’ book, "The Lotus Position" and then declined it shortly after. A fan of Lotus’ found this out by going through her mail and it' is assumed that they sent Rivers a death threat. An investigator was hired and reported that Lotus was behind this (though many of her friends emphasized how impossible that would be considering the type of person Lotus was and her outlook on life). Rivers proceeded to send the findings to many influential people in the comedy scene making it hard for Lotus to be hired. 

Lotus did not only owe Rivers for her career coming to slow close; she was not  known to be the smartest businesswoman. She had trouble giving up smaller shows for bigger ones, once she had already booked them, even though the bigger venues got her more attention. Some said she did not  have the TV presence that was necessary for her success, either. Despite these critiques, many thought, and still think, highly of Lotus’ comedy and character.

Personal life 
Lotus met Lenny Bruce in 1965, when she was 22 and he was 40 years old. They developed an instant connection and were engaged up until his death in August 1966. Lotus was shocked and devastated about Bruce's death. She became quite spiritual; poetry and song ended up helping her heal after this loss. This is when she took on the name Lotus. Later, Lotus found herself in Toronto where she met David Jove. They got married about two weeks after meeting one another. Almost immediately, Lotus got pregnant with her daughter, Lili. Lotus and Jove never raised Lili together and were divorced in the late eighties. In the nineties, Lotus was in a relationship with the British actor and director, Steven Berkoff. Lili and Lotus were quite close all the way until Lotus passed away. Lili was Lotus’ pride and joy, and she would talk about her every chance she got. For the first 5 years of Lili's life, Lotus performed much less, focusing on being a mother. Lili was an amazing violinist and Lotus was extremely proud of her ability to play. She missed plenty of comedy opportunities to focus on being a mother, her first priority. Lili went on to attend Brown University. Before Lili went to Brown, she and Lotus performed a show together called "Molly and Maze." It showed at the Beverly Hills’ Eagle Theatre prior to Lili's leaving for college and then an amended version was performed in San Diego at the Gaslamp Quarter Theatre Company's Hahn Cosmopolitan after she graduated.

Later life and death 
In Thanksgiving of 1996 Lotus found out she had an untreatable brain tumor. The night before she and Lili were headed to a clinic in La Jolla that specialized in alternative medicine, she had a seizure that resulted in a herniated brainstem. This left her paralyzed and limited her motor skills as well as her ability to talk. On August 31, 1997, Lotus died at Kaiser Permanente Hospital in Hollywood at the age of 54. She was surrounded by her daughter and closest friends.

References

External links

American stand-up comedians
American women comedians
1943 births
1997 deaths
Lenny Bruce
20th-century American comedians